World Market Center Las Vegas, located at 495 Grand Central Parkway in Las Vegas, Nevada, is a  showcase for the home and hospitality contract furnishings industry in downtown Las Vegas. It is the largest showroom complex in the world for the home and hospitality furnishings industry, serving domestic and international sellers and buyers.

History 

In 2002, the developers announced that the project was to be built on a lot adjacent to the City of Las Vegas'   redevelopment parcel, as an eight building,  facility designed by Jon Jerde of Jerde Partnership in association with Edward Vance of JMA Architecture Studios. The square footage of the main building alone is greater than that of the Empire State Building in New York City. In 2005, WMCLV announced plans for completion of an expansion increasing the space to a total of  complete with skywalks between all buildings on all levels.

The first show, July 21–25, 2005, was so overbooked that it used space in three Pavilions (huge tent structures) and the Las Vegas Convention Center.

Construction started on the 16 story,  Building B in 2005. It opened in January 2007.

Construction on the 16 story,  Building C started on September 27, 2006 and completed July 2008. The first 2 floors are part of the Las Vegas Design Center.

In 2008, World Market Center put plans on hold to finish its complex of buildings, originally slated to be about 12 million square feet and set for completion by 2013.

World Market Center is owned by International Market Centers, L.P. (IMC). On May 3, 2011, Bain Capital, Oaktree Capital Management, The Related Companies, and other investors announced the formation of International Market Centers, a venture that combines properties in High Point and Las Vegas and would control 11.5 million square feet of showroom space. At that point, two of the World Market Center buildings and two of the High Point showroom complexes had been in receivership for several months. In a deal completed September 26, 2017, Blackstone Real Estate Partners, Blackstone Tactical Opportunities and Fireside Investments purchased IMC, which at the time owned 5.4 million square feet in three Las Vegas locations.

In August 2019, construction began on the Expo at World Market Center building. It is a  convention facility that will connect to Building C. The expo building will replace the Pavilion tent facilities located across the street. The tents would be removed upon completion of the expo building and the 21-acre land will initially be used for parking, with the potential for future development. The expo building was topped off on December 19, 2019, and was opened on April 9, 2021.

Las Vegas Market
Las Vegas Market is the name of the major trade show hosted by the World Market Center Las Vegas.

Las Vegas Design Center
When not hosting the Las Vegas Market or other trade shows, the first two floors of Building A are open as showrooms for interior designers and the general public Monday-Friday 10-5pm. The LVDC offers year-round access to a global selection of furniture, fabrics, lighting, floor coverings, wall décor and accessories.

Part of Las Vegas Design Center’s ongoing programming includes the First Friday series, a monthly A&D event featuring top design and arts and cultural speakers from around the world. The Design Icon award is part of the Design Series and celebrates modern-day design legends and gives them a platform to share their stories and inspire others. The Winter 2010 Las Vegas Market Design Icon will be Christopher Guy Harrison. Previous Design Icon honorees include Juan Montoya, Vicente Wolf, Roger Thomas, Vladimir Kagan and Larry Laslo.

Gallery

References

External links 

World Market Center Las Vegas web site

Buildings and structures in Las Vegas
Downtown Las Vegas
Wholesale markets
Marketing companies of the United States